The 2010 Ritro Slovak Open was a professional tennis tournament played on indoor hard courts. It was the eleventh edition of the tournament which was part of the Tretorn SERIE+ series of the 2010 ATP Challenger Tour and the 2010 ITF Women's Circuit. It took place in Bratislava, Slovakia between 15 and 21 November 2010.

ATP entrants

Seeds

 Rankings are as of November 8, 2010.

Other entrants
The following players received wildcards into the singles main draw:
  Dominik Hrbatý
  Martin Kližan
  Andrej Martin
  Marek Semjan

The following player received a Special Exempt into the singles main draw:
  James Ward

The following players received entry from the qualifying draw:
  Ryan Harrison
  Mikhail Ledovskikh
  Miloslav Mečíř Jr.
  Timo Nieminen

WTA entrants

Seeds

 Rankings are as of November 8, 2010.

Other entrants
The following players received wildcards into the singles main draw:
  Anna Karolína Schmiedlová
  Chantal Škamlová
  Jana Čepelová
  Zuzana Luknárová

The following players received entry from the qualifying draw:
  Sina Haas
  Réka-Luca Jani
  Klaudia Boczová
  Julia Babilon
  Michaela Hončová
  Jasmina Tinjić
  Lenka Tvarošková
  Lucia Butkovská

Champions

Men's singles

 Martin Kližan def.  Stefan Koubek, 7–6(4), 6–2

Women's singles

 Kateryna Bondarenko def.  Evgeniya Rodina, 7–6(3), 6–2

Men's doubles

 Colin Fleming /  Jamie Murray def.  Travis Parrott /  Filip Polášek, 6–2, 3–6, [10–6]

Women's doubles

 Emma Laine /  Irena Pavlovic def.  Claire Feuerstein /  Valeria Savinykh, 6–4, 6–4

External links
Official Website
ITF Search 
ATP official site

Ritro Slovak Open
Ritro Slovak Open
Ritro Slovak Open
Ritro Slovak Open
Slovak Open